Schauspielhaus Salzburg is a theatre in Salzburg, Austria.

Theatres in Salzburg